Lago di Cavazzo or Lago dei Tre Comuni is a lake in the Province of Udine, Friuli-Venezia Giulia, Italy. At an elevation of 191 m, its surface area is 1.74 km².

Lakes of Friuli-Venezia Giulia